Kristin K. Devold (born 2 October 1939) is a Norwegian politician for the Conservative Party.

She served as a deputy representative to the Norwegian Parliament from Møre og Romsdal during the term 1989–1993. In total she met during 27 days of parliamentary session.

References

1939 births
Living people
Deputy members of the Storting
Conservative Party (Norway) politicians
Møre og Romsdal politicians
Women members of the Storting
Place of birth missing (living people)